The Anniversary may refer to:
  
 The Anniversary, a 1966 British play by Bill MacIlwraith
 The Anniversary (1968 film), a 1968 British film adaptation of the 1966 play, directed by Roy Ward Baker
 "The Anniversary" (Fawlty Towers), a 1979 episode of the British sitcom Fawlty Towers
 The Anniversary, American alternative rock band formed in 1997
 The Anniversary Party, a 2001 American comedy-drama film, directed by Jennifer Jason Leigh and Alan Cumming
 The Anniversary (2004 film), a 2003 short film directed by Ham Tran
 The Anniversary (2014 film), directed by Canadian Valerie Buhagiar

See also

Anniversary (disambiguation)